Squidward Q. Tentacles is a fictional character voiced by actor Rodger Bumpass in the Nickelodeon animated television series SpongeBob SquarePants. Squidward was created and designed by marine biologist and animator Stephen Hillenburg. He first appeared on television in the series' pilot episode "Help Wanted" on May 1, 1999.

Although his name has the word "squid" in it and he has only six tentacles, Squidward is an anthropomorphic octopus. He lives in a moai between SpongeBob SquarePants' and Patrick Star's houses. The character is portrayed as short-tempered, impatient, arrogant, condescending, bitter, and misanthropic, and he hates his two neighbors' constant disruptive antics. However, the pair are unaware of Squidward's dislike towards them and see him as a friend. Squidward works as a cashier at the Krusty Krab restaurant, a job which he does not enjoy.

The character's reception from fans has been positive. Squidward has appeared in many SpongeBob SquarePants publications, toys, and other merchandise. He appears in The SpongeBob SquarePants Movie (2004), The SpongeBob Movie: Sponge Out of Water (2015), and The SpongeBob Movie: Sponge on the Run (2020).

Role in SpongeBob SquarePants

Squidward is depicted as a grumpy and bitter turquoise octopus. He lives in the underwater city of Bikini Bottom in a moai situated between SpongeBob SquarePants' pineapple house and Patrick Star's rock. Squidward is annoyed by his neighbors for their perpetual laughter and boisterous behavior, though SpongeBob and Patrick are oblivious to being a nuisance to Squidward.

Squidward lives in a constant state of self-pity and misery; he is unhappy with his humdrum lifestyle and yearns for celebrity status, wealth, hair, and a glamorous and distinguished career as a musician or painter with a passion for art and playing the clarinet, although he has no actual talent for either. However, he is left to endure the lowly status as a fast-food cashier at the Krusty Krab restaurant. Squidward resents his job and is irritated by his greedy employer Mr. Krabs and by having his own resented neighbor SpongeBob as a colleague.

Development

Creation and design
Stephen Hillenburg first became fascinated with the ocean and began developing his artistic abilities as a child. During college, he majored in marine biology and minored in art. After graduating in 1984, he joined the Ocean Institute, an ocean education organization, where he had the idea to create a comic book titled The Intertidal Zone, which led to the creation of SpongeBob SquarePants. In 1987, Hillenburg left the institute to pursue a career in animation.

Several years after studying experimental animation at the California Institute of the Arts, Hillenburg met Joe Murray, creator of Rocko's Modern Life, at an animation festival. Murray offered Hillenburg a job as a director of the series. Martin Olson, one of the writers for Rocko's Modern Life, read The Intertidal Zone and encouraged Hillenburg to create a television series with a similar concept. At that point, Hillenburg had not considered creating his own series, but soon realized that this was his chance. Shortly after production on Rocko's Modern Life ended in 1996, Hillenburg began working on SpongeBob SquarePants.

Hillenburg used some character designs from his comic book. He designed "SpongeBob's grumpy next door neighbor" as an octopus because he liked the species' large head; he said octopuses "have such a large bulbous head, and Squidward thinks he's an intellectual, so of course he's gonna have a large bulbous head." Hillenburg explained that Squidward is normally drawn with six limbs because "it was really just simpler for animation to draw him with six legs instead of eight". Squidward is only shown with a full set of eight legs in two episodes: the live-action sequence in "Pressure" from season two, and briefly in "Sold!" from season nine. Hillenburg named the character Squidward after the squid, which is closely related to the octopus and has ten limbs. In the words of Squidward's voice actor Rodger Bumpass, the name Octoward "just didn't work".

Of Squidward's design, show writer and storyboard artist Vincent Waller said in 2010: Squidward is hard to drawhe has a very odd-shaped head. Fortunately, his emotions are pretty even, but to get a whole lot of big emoting out of him is a challenge. His nose splits everything in half, so it's always like, 'OK, how am I going to work this and still make it read?'

Hillenburg thought of making jokes with Squidward ejecting ink but retired it because, according to him, "it always looks like he's pooping his pants". Despite this, inking jokes would appear in the episodes "Giant Squidward" and "Ink Lemonade". The sound of Squidward's footsteps, which evokes that of suction cups pulling on the ground, is produced by rubbing hot water bottles. The footsteps, and those of the rest of the main characters, are recorded by the show's foley crew. Sound designer Jeff Hutchins said that footstep sounds "[help] tell which character it is and what surface they're stepping on". Bumpass inspired the idea of having Squidward ride a recumbent bicycle; Bumpass owns one of these bicycles, which he rides around Burbank, California. Bumpass described it as his "little inside joke".

Voice

Squidward's voice is provided by actor Rodger Bumpass, who voices several other SpongeBob SquarePants characters, including Squidward's mother. While creating the show and writing its pilot episode in 1997, Hillenburg and the show's then-creative director Derek Drymon were also conducting voice auditions. Mr. Lawrence, who had worked with Hillenburg and Drymon on Rocko's Modern Life, was Hillenburg's first choice for the role. Hillenburg had invited Lawrence to audition for all the show's characters. Instead of Squidward, Hillenburg decided to give Lawrence the part of Plankton, the series' villain.

According to Bumpass, Squidward was "a very nasally, monotone kind of guy". He said the character became interesting to perform because of "his sarcasm, and then his frustration, and then his apoplexy, and so he became a wide spectrum of emotions". Tom Kenny, the voice of SpongeBob, describes Bumpass recording his lines in the studio, saying, "I love watching Rodger ... He's right next to me". According to Kenny, when Bumpass "goes apoplectic" as Squidward while recording, his head turns red, "and you're afraid he's going to have an embolism".

Several of the show's crew praise Bumpass for his performance and similitude to the character. Kenny called Bumpass "brilliant" and said, "[he] is sort of like Squidward". Staff writer Kent Osborne said, "I remember thinking about how much Rodger talks and acts like Squidward. That's why it's such a good voice—he's so connected to it". However, Bumpass said, "I'm not him and he's not me, but what I'm required to do for him and what I am enabled to do for him is what makes it like me. It fits my particular talents and skills very well. So in that respect, yeah, he is me, but I am not the cranky, sarcastic, underachieving kind of guy that he is. He's easy to fall in, I will say that."

Squidward's voice has been compared to that of Jack Benny's. Kenny said, "To me, there's something just so funny about that Jack-Benny-loyal-to-nobody character that Rodger Bumpass does such a great job of playing [...] Squidward". Arthur Brown, author of Everything I Need to Know, I Learned from Cartoons!, said that Squidward "sounds a lot like Jack Benny". Bumpass repudiated the relationship, saying "Jack Benny, no. Although he does have this observational sarcasm he occasionally brought out."

Reception
Squidward has received positive reception from critics and fans. SpongeBob's voice actor Tom Kenny named Squidward his favorite character on the show. He said, "He has an extra dimension where SpongeBob and Patrick's capacity of play mystifies him, but he's also jealous of it. When he tries to participate, he just fails utterly because he doesn't believe in it." Staff writer Casey Alexander said, "Squidward is the character I relate to the most. In an exaggerated way, he's the most human character. If I knew a human like SpongeBob, I probably would react to him like Squidward does". American singer Pharrell Williams, who says he is a fan of the show, said that "Squidward is my favorite, though. If he was a human, I would hang out with him."

Bill Treadway of DVD Verdict said that Squidward is "a cross between Bert [of Sesame Street], Woody Allen, and Roger Addison [of Mr. Ed] ... but he has some heart, if you can find it". Treadway called him "the straight man for his neighbor's antics". Film critic A. O. Scott of The New York Times said, in his review of The SpongeBob SquarePants Movie, that Squidward is one of his favorite secondary characters on the show, along with Sandy Cheeks and Mrs. Puff. He wrote, "I was sorry to see [them] pushed to the margins". Also from the same publication, television critic Joyce Millman said that Squidward has "the nasal bitchiness of Paul Lynde and the artistic pretensions of Felix Unger." Millman further wrote, "Hmmm, Squidward is one gay squid, I think."

"Band Geeks", a second-season episode that focuses on Squidward, is often considered by many critics and fans alike as one of the show's best episodes. Writing for The Washington Post, Michael Cavna ranked "Band Geeks" as the fifth best episode of SpongeBob SquarePants. In his review, Cavna said, "Squidward's mix of artistic aspiration in the face of goading, humiliation and unrelenting sub-mediocrity made this a kids' episode that adults can experience on a whole 'nother level." On a less positive note, Squidward was listed among Common Sense Media's "10 Worst TV Role Models of 2012". Author Sierra Filucci said that the character's selfishness is his "worst offense", called Squidward "the mean and nasty cashier at the Krusty Krab" and said that "[he] is nice only when he wants something".

At the 39th Daytime Emmy Awards in 2012, Bumpass was nominated for his vocal performance as Squidward in the Outstanding Performer in the Animated Program categorythe first cast member to be nominated in this category. The award was won by June Foray of The Garfield Show. Bumpass has said he was proud of the certificate he received for the nomination, but "there wasn't really a competition because one of the other nominees was June Foray and she is royalty in the animation world ... There was no way any of the other three guys had a chance. In fact, if any of us had one, there would have been a riot in that studio ." He said he was "happy to lose to June Foray" and "very pleased and grateful to get a nomination".

In other media
Squidward has been included in various SpongeBob SquarePants-related merchandise, including board games, books, plush toys, and trading cards. Alongside the television series, Squidward appears in issues of SpongeBob Comics (which were first published in February 2011), in many SpongeBob SquarePants video games, and in various theme parks and theme park parades (including Sea World and Universal's Superstar Parade, respectively). In 2004, Squidward appeared in the first feature-length film adaptation of the show, The SpongeBob SquarePants Movie, which was released on November 19, 2004, and was financially successful, grossing over  worldwide. He also appears in the film's sequel, which was released in theaters on February 6, 2015.

The episode "The Sponge Who Could Fly" was adapted in 2009 as a stage musical at the Liverpool Empire Theatre, and later in South Africa. Actor Charles Brunton originated the role of Squidward, later recalling that he loved the character, and the "fun [of] trying to re-create a well established cartoon character into a live performance on stage." Brunton prepared for the role by buying nine DVDs of the series, acting out Squidward's part in each episode, in his bedroom. He said, "it took ages to perfect the voice and the way he used his arms". Brunton's performance and the musical were well received by most critics. A critic from The Public Reviews wrote, "Charles Brunton as Squidward really stole the show for us, his character was nailed to perfection, from his comic acting, voice and mannerisms this was a faultless performance". In his review for The Northern Echo, Viv Hardwick said, "Charles Brunton makes a convincing Squidward". The role was played by Chris van Rensburg in South Africa.

2016 stage musical 
A stage musical based on the show was premiered in June 2016 at the Oriental Theatre in Chicago. Actor Gavin Lee originated the role of Squidward and reprised the role in the musical's Broadway run and television adaptation The SpongeBob Musical: Live on Stage!. As Lee was not familiar with the show prior to his audition, Lee binge-watched eight SpongeBob episodes and listened to Rodger Bumpass' voice.

Gavin Lee liked how Squidward is the one grumpy character in an upbeat musical. Three times in the musical, Squidward is stopped from singing, so that when his number "I'm Not a Loser" is finally sung in Act 2, "the audience is just gagging for Squidward to finally express himself", as Gavin Lee described. "I'm Not a Loser" features Squidward tap-dancing backed by a chorus line of sea anemones.

To play the four-legged Squidward, Lee wore two extra fake legs. Lee said that he wanted the fake legs to be secure and asymmetrical to his real legs, which made the legs uncomfortable to wear, but he likes them as a gimmick and how the audience reacted positively to them. Since Squidward tap-danced with four legs in "I'm Not a Loser", Lee and choreographer Chris Gattelli worked together to figure out how Lee would tap-dance with two extra tap shoes, as neither had tap-danced like that before. Lee said that in order to make four tap noises, he tap-danced in a more "sloppy" way: "Having loose ankles, but also having the tension there to make the noises with the extra [taps]."

Gavin Lee's performance as Squidward and his tap dance number "I'm Not a Loser" are considered a highlight of the show. In his review of the Chicago run, Steven Oxman of Variety called Squidward the "unquestionable highlight" and described "I'm Not a Loser" as "a dose of true Broadway pizzazz, and expresses the character’s inner self with sensitivity and flair." Reviewing the Broadway run, Alexis Soloski of The Guardian called Lee's tap number "rapturous", while Peter Marks on The Washington Post considers it "a particular joy". Vice'''s Jo Rosenthal considered Lee's performance of "I'm Not a Loser" as "heart-rending" and "earned his standing ovation". In 2018, for his performance in the Broadway run, Gavin Lee won a Drama Desk Award for Outstanding Featured Actor in a Musical and was nominated for a Tony Award for Best Featured Actor in a Musical.

In the 2019–20 North American tour of the musical, Squidward was played by Cody Cooley. Although he was skeptical about the idea of a SpongeBob musical at first, Cooley is impressed when he watched the Broadway run. When Cooley watched the Broadway run with his friends, they commented that Cooley would be fit for Squidward because Cooley was considered grouchy. Cooley himself said that he relate to Squidward's pessimism and sarcastic personality. Cooley had applied twice for the role before being called for audition and given the role. After being cast, Cooley rewatched the first three seasons of SpongeBob'' to study Squidward's character.

Cooley said that Squidward's tap number is his favorite part of the show. Prior to getting the role, Cooley already had tap-dancing experience. During the rehearsal in New York City, Cooley learned how to tap with the two extra tap shoes and practiced it usually twice a day to build up stamina. Cooley considered stamina important for the tap number because the extra legs weighs 25 pounds, he must dance for at least seven minutes and the number ends with a kickline. He also learned how to play clarinet for the part where Squidward plays it at the end of the show.

Notes

References

Fictional artists
Television characters introduced in 1999
Animated characters introduced in 1999
Fictional musicians
Fictional octopuses
Fictional sculptors
Fictional undersea characters
Fictional waiting staff
Comedy film characters
Male characters in animated series
SpongeBob SquarePants characters
Anthropomorphic molluscs
Fictional bullies
Male characters in television